The 1884 Cincinnati Red Stockings season was a season in American baseball. The team finished fifth in the American Association with a record of 68–41, 8 games behind the New York Metropolitans.

Regular season 
The Red Stockings were looking to return to their 1882 form, when they won the American Association pennant before falling to third place in 1883. The club named pitcher Will White the player-manager for the 1884 season, taking over for catcher Pop Snyder. Cincinnati was relatively quiet during the off-season, although they did sign Tom Mansell, who had split the previous season between the Detroit Wolverines of the National League, and the St. Louis Browns of the AA, hitting .305 with 34 RBI and 45 runs between those two teams. The club also moved into American Park for the 1884 season.

John Reilly was the offensive force on the team, hitting .339 with eleven home runs and 91 RBI, all club highs. Charley Jones hit .314 with seven home runs and 71 RBI, along with a team high 117 runs. On the mound, White led the way with a 34–18 record and a 3.32 ERA in 52 starts.

Season summary 
Cincinnati got off to a slow start, as they lost their first game in their new ballpark, 10–9 to the Columbus Buckeyes, and they had a record of 4–5 in their first nine games, before reeling off four wins in a row to stay above the .500 level for the rest of the season. The Red Stockings got red hot, as they eventually had a 28–14 record, only one game out of first place. In a three-game series against the Washington Nationals, the Red Stockings outscored their opposition 48–6. Cincinnati started to fade as the season continued on, and with their record at 44–27 changed managers, bringing Pop Snyder back as player-manager. Cincinnati continued to slump, falling to 10½ games out of first place with a 52–35 record, but then won ten games in a row to climb back to within 4½ games. It was too little too late though, as Cincinnati finished the season with a 68–41 record, good enough for fifth place, eight games behind the Metropolitans.

Season standings

Record vs. opponents

Roster

Player stats

Batting

Starters by position 
Note: Pos = Position; G = Games played; AB = At bats; H = Hits; Avg. = Batting average; HR = Home runs; RBI = Runs batted in

Other batters 
Note: G = Games played; AB = At bats; H = Hits; Avg. = Batting average; HR = Home runs; RBI = Runs batted in

Pitching

Starting pitchers 
Note: G = Games pitched; IP = Innings pitched; W = Wins; L = Losses; ERA = Earned run average; SO = Strikeouts

Relief pitchers 
Note: G = Games pitched; W = Wins; L = Losses; SV = Saves; ERA = Earned run average; SO = Strikeouts

References

External links
1884 Cincinnati Red Stockings season at Baseball Reference

Cincinnati Reds seasons
Cincinnati Red Stockings season
Cincinnati Reds